Gabriel Franchère ( 3 November 1786 –12 April 1863) was a French Canadian author and explorer of the Pacific Northwest.

Franchère was born in Montreal to Gabriel Franchère (4 March 1752 - 16 May 1832) and Marie-Félicité Morin (20 August 1760 - 28 September 1807). He later joined the Pacific Fur Company as a merchant apprentice, arriving at Fort Astoria on the Tonquin. After Astoria was sold to the North West Company, Franchère returned to Montreal overland in 1814. He was employed for a time by John Jacob Astor in Montreal. He wrote Narrative of a Voyage to the Northwest Coast of America, which was published in 1819. This work was translated into English and edited in 1851, and later rereleased as part of the General Series of the Champlain Society in 1969. The untranslated version was one of Washington Irving's sources for his book Astoria.

The mountain Franchère Peak in the Canadian Rockies was named in his honor in 1917.

References

External links

Gabriel Franchère from the Dictionary of Canadian Biography
The Quebec History Encyclopedia: Gabriel Franchère from Marianopolis College
 
Narrative of a Voyage to the Northwest Coast of America in the years 1811, 1812, 1813, and 1814 or the First American Settlement on the Pacific
  

French Quebecers
Canadian explorers
Explorers of Oregon
Oregon Country
Canadian non-fiction writers in French
Canadian male non-fiction writers
1786 births
1863 deaths